Vex'd were an English dubstep duo signed to Planet Mu Records, consisting of Jamie Teasdale and Roly Porter. They often played at early DMZ nights and were some of the early pioneers of the genre. As of 2010 they have released two albums, as well as several EPs and singles.

Albums
 Degenerate (2005)
 Cloud Seed (2010)

Singles
 "Function" (2004)
 "Lion/Ghost" (2004)
 "Pop Pop/Canyon" (2005)
 "Gunman/Smart Bomb" (2006)
 "Bombardment Of Saturn" (2008)
 "3rd Choice" (2008)

References

External links 
 planet mu · Vex’d

Dubstep musicians
English electronic music groups
Planet Mu artists